E. K. Duraiswamy was elected to the state of Tamil Nadu Member of Legislative Assembly from the Gudiyatham constituency in the year 1971 election. He was a candidate of the Dravida Munnetra Kazhagam (DMK) party. He was the First MLA from Dravida Munnetra Kazhagam (DMK) in Gudiyatham Constituency. He got 34954 votes and succeeded D.A. Adimoolam with 16374 votes.

References 

Dravida Munnetra Kazhagam politicians
Members of the Tamil Nadu Legislative Assembly
Year of birth missing
Possibly living people
Tamil Nadu politicians